The Oregonian is a 2011 horror film directed by Calvin Reeder. The movie premiered at the 2011 Sundance Film Festival and was given a limited release beginning on June 8, 2012, partially as a result of a successful Kickstarter campaign. The Oregonian received a DVD release in early 2013.

The film stars Lindsay Pulsipher as a young woman who, after waking up from a car crash with no recollection of what happened, journeys through a surreal landscape and meets multiple bizarre characters.

Plot

The movie follows a young woman from Oregon (Lindsay Pulsipher), who gets into a car accident and as a result, finds herself in a surreal landscape. She has complete amnesia and cannot remember what has happened or even who she is. As she wanders around in an attempt to find help and safety, she comes across several increasingly bizarre people.

Cast
Lindsay Pulsipher as The Oregonian
Robert Longstreet as Herb
Matt Olsen as Blond Stranger
Lynne Compton as Red Stranger
Roger M. Mayer	as Omelette Man
Barlow Jacobs as Bud
Tipper Newton as Julie
Chadwick Brown as Ronnie
Jed Maheu as Murph
Zumi Rosow as Carlotta
Scott Honea as James
Christian Palmer as Handsome Deadman
Christo Dimassis as Bud's Friend
Mandy M Bailey as Stranger
Meredith Binder as Stranger

Reception
On review aggregator Rotten Tomatoes, The Oregonian holds an approval rating of 44%, based on 9 reviews, and an average rating of 4.94/10. On Metacritic, the film has a weighted average score of 46 out of 100, based on 4 critics, indicating "mixed or average reviews".

Michael Nordine from Slant Magazine rated the film one and a half out of four stars, calling the film "a jumbled mess that can’t make its deliberate incoherence interesting". Dennis Harvey of Variety offered the film similar criticism, writing, "Reeder shows a knack for unsettling audiovisual textures, but once it’s clear The Oregonian will offer no real storyline or explanations, viewer patience wears thin".

The film was not without its supporters'
David D'Arcy from Screen Daily commended the film's atmosphere, soundtrack, and Pulsipher's performance. David Fear of Time Out rated the film three out of five stars, writing, "though Reeder’s attempts to unnerve sometimes veer close to enfant terrible posturing, The Oregonian knows how to work its unpleasantness to primo psychotronic effect". Eric Kohn from IndieWire awarded the film a score B+, writing, "Alternately creepy, puzzling and assaulting on the senses, at best The Oregonian functions as a nightmarish headtrip with ample doses of dark comedy". Kohn, however, criticized the film's third act, which he felt 'failed to put its compelling fragments together'.

References

External links

2011 films
2010s avant-garde and experimental films
2011 independent films
2010s English-language films
2011 horror films
American avant-garde and experimental films
American horror films
American independent films
Films shot in Los Angeles
Films shot in California
Films shot in Washington (state)
Films set in Oregon
Kickstarter-funded films
2010s American films